Masbateño may refer to:
the Masbateño people
the Masbateño language